The Beijing-Shenyang Through Train is a Chinese railway that runs between the capital of China, Beijing to Shenyang, the capital of Liaoning. An express passenger train jointly operated by the Beijing Railway Bureau and Shenyang Railway Bureau, the Shenyang Railway Bureau is responsible for passenger transportation. CRH5 Type Passenger trains run along the Jingha Railway across Liaoning, Hebei, Tianjin, Beijing, and other provinces and cities for 622 km.

Train trips 
D1: Beijing - Shenyang
D2: Shenyang - Beijing
D3: Beijing - Shenyang North
D4: Shenyang North - Beijing
D5: Beijing - Shenyang North
D6: Shenyang North - Beijing
D7: Beijing - Shenyang North
D8: Shenyang North - Beijing
D9: Beijing - Shenyang North
D10: Shenyang North - Beijing
D11: Beijing - Shenyang North
D12: Shenyang North - Beijing
D13: Beijing - Shenyang
D14: Shenyang North - Beijing
D15: Beijing - Shenyang
D16: Shenyang - Beijing
D17: Beijing - Shenyang North
D18: Shenyang North - Beijing
D51: Beijing - Shenyang North
D52: Beijing - Shenyang North

See also 
K53/54 Beijing-Shenyang Through Train
D51/52 Beijing-Shenyang Through Train
G217/218 Beijing-Shenyang Through Train
G219/220 Beijing-Shenyang Through Train

References 

D
Rail transport in Beijing
Rail transport in Liaoning